Michigan's 2nd House of Representatives district (also referred to as Michigan's 2nd House district) is a legislative district within the Michigan House of Representatives located in the northeastern portion of Wayne County, Michigan, including much of Detroit's East Side and the Cities of Grosse Pointe Farms, Grosse Pointe, and Grosse Pointe Park. The district was created in 1965, when the Michigan House of Representatives district naming scheme changed from a county-based system to a numerical one.

List of representatives

District Boundaries

Recent Elections

References 

Michigan House of Representatives districts
Government of Detroit
Metro Detroit